Katarina Kowplos (born 5 October 2001) is an Australian sports shooter. 

Kowplos represented Australia at the 2020 Summer Olympics in Tokyo, Japan. She competed in the women's 10 metre air rifle, the women's 50 metre rifle three positions event, and the mixed 10 metre air rifle team events. She did not score sufficient points in either event to advance past qualification.

References

External links
 

2001 births
Living people
Australian female sport shooters
Olympic shooters of Australia
Shooters at the 2020 Summer Olympics
Place of birth missing (living people)
21st-century Australian women